The Lord Chief Justice of England and Wales is the Head of the Judiciary of England and Wales and the President of the Courts of England and Wales.

Until 2005 the Lord Chief Justice was the second-most senior judge of the Courts of England and Wales, surpassed by the Lord Chancellor who normally sat in the highest court. The Constitutional Reform Act 2005 changed the roles of judges, creating the position of President of the Supreme Court of the United Kingdom and altering the duties of the Lord Chief Justice and Lord Chancellor. The Lord Chief Justice ordinarily serves as President of the Criminal Division of the Court of Appeal and Head of Criminal Justice, meaning its technical processes within the legal domain, but under the 2005 Act can appoint another judge to these positions.

The equivalent in Scotland is the Lord President of the Court of Session, who also holds the post of Lord Justice-General in the High Court of Justiciary. The equivalent in Northern Ireland is the Lord Chief Justice of Northern Ireland, local successor to the Lord Chief Justice of Ireland of the pre-Partition era.

The current Lord Chief Justice is Lord Burnett of Maldon, who assumed the role on 2 October 2017.

History
Originally, each of the three high common law courts, the King's Bench, the Court of Common Pleas, and the Court of the Exchequer, had its own chief justice: the Lord Chief Justice, Chief Justice of the Common Pleas, and Chief Baron of the Exchequer. The Court of the King's (or Queen's) Bench had existed since 1234. In 1268 its foremost judge was given the title of (lord) chief justice; previously one of the justices would be considered the senior judge, and fulfil an analogous role.

The three courts became divisions of the High Court in 1875 (though the head of each court continued in post). Following the deaths of Lord Chief Justice Sir Alexander Cockburn and Chief Baron Sir Fitzroy Kelly in 1880, the three divisions were merged into a single division, with Lord Coleridge, the last Chief Justice of Common Pleas, as Lord Chief Justice of England.

The suffix "and Wales", now found in statutes and elsewhere, was of a holder's own motion and to reflect centuries-old reality, appended during the tenure of Lord Bingham of Cornhill. He held this office between 1996 and 2000.

Constitutional Reform Act 2005
The Constitutional Reform Act 2005 (CRA) made the Lord Chief Justice the president of the Courts of England and Wales, vesting the office with many of the powers formerly held by the Lord Chancellor. While the Lord Chief Justice retains the role of President of the Criminal Division of the Court of Appeal, the CRA separated the role of President of the Queen's Bench Division; the changed chief justice role was first held by Lord Phillips of Worth Matravers. The CRA provides that the chief justice is chosen by a specially appointed committee convened by the Judicial Appointments Commission.

Lord chief justices of the King's (Queen's) Bench, to 1880

Lord chief justices of England (later England and Wales) 1880–present

Hereditary peerages created for the Lord Chief Justice

Thomas Parker, 1st Earl of Macclesfield/Baron Parker – extant
Robert Raymond, 1st Baron Raymond – extinct 1756
Philip Yorke, 1st Earl of Hardwicke/Baron Hardwicke – extant
William Murray, 1st Earl of Mansfield/Earl of Mansfield/Baron Mansfield – extant
Lloyd Kenyon, 1st Baron Kenyon – extant
Edward Law, 1st Baron Ellenborough – extant
Charles Abbott, 1st Baron Tenterden – extinct 1939
Thomas Denman, 1st Baron Denman – extant
 Rufus Isaacs, 1st Earl of Reading/Viscount Reading/Baron Reading – extant, held by the Marquess of Reading
 Alfred Lawrence, 1st Baron Trevethin – extant, held by the Baron Trevethin and Oaksey
 Gordon Hewart, 1st Baron Hewart – extinct 1964

See also
:Category:Lord chief justices of England and Wales
:Category:English judges
:Category:Judges of the Court of Appeal (England and Wales)
Master of the Rolls

References and footnotes

Citations

Footnotes

Bibliography
Campbell, John (1874), Lives of the Chief Justices of England, in four volumes (two additional volumes were a "Continuation by Sir Joseph Arnould – Late Judge of the High Court of Bombay"), 3rd ed. London, John Murray 1874.

Judiciary of England and Wales
Lord Chief Justice, England and Wales